Life and Death (Swedish: På liv och död) is a 1943 Swedish drama film directed by Rolf Husberg and starring Nils Kihlberg, Birgit Tengroth and Hasse Ekman. The film's sets were designed by the art director Bibi Lindström.

Plot summary 
During World War II, a train accident in the northern part of Sweden is suspected to be a sabotage. Some soldiers and guests at a ski hotel try to investigate what happened and determine who is responsible.

Cast
Birgit Tengroth as Karin Sjövall 
Nils Kihlberg as Fänrik Sture Holm 
Hasse Ekman as Kirre Granlund 
Lillebil Kjellén as Gittan 
Gull Natorp as Mrs. Lewen 
Björn Berglund as Petter Pettersson, soldier 
Fritiof Billquist as Jöns Jönsson 
Gunnar Sjöberg as Sergeant Lundblad 
Rune Halvarsson as Berra Sandström, soldier 
Karl-Arne Holmsten as Lieutenant Lönnbäck 
Olof Widgren as Captain C. Åström 
Anna-Stina Wåglund as Mrs. Jönsson 
Kotti Chave as Lasse Persson, ski instructor
 Birger Malmsten as 	Telephone Operator
 Mimi Nelson as 	Dancing Woman

References

Bibliography
 Gustafsson, Fredrik. The Man from the Third Row: Hasse Ekman, Swedish Cinema and the Long Shadow of Ingmar Bergman. Berghahn Books, 2016.

External links

1943 films
1940s Swedish-language films
Films directed by Rolf Husberg
Swedish drama films
Swedish black-and-white films
1943 drama films
1940s Swedish films